Alan Bloomingdale (born March 1, 1953) is a former American football running back who played two seasons in the Canadian Football League with the Ottawa Rough Riders and Toronto Argonauts. He played college football at the University of Maryland, College Park.

References

External links
Just Sports Stats
College stats

Living people
1953 births
American football running backs
Canadian football running backs
American players of Canadian football
Maryland Terrapins football players
Ottawa Rough Riders players
Toronto Argonauts players